Sherrill is a surname.

People
Notable American people with the surname include:

Billy Sherrill (1936–2015), American country-music producer
Charles H. Sherrill (1814–1887), New York politician
Charles H. Sherrill (ambassador) (1867–1936), American diplomat
George Sherrill (born 1977), baseball relief pitcher
Jackie Sherrill (born 1943), football coach
John and Elizabeth Sherrill (John 1923–2017, Elizabeth born 1928), Christian writers
Mikie Sherrill (Rebecca Michelle Sherrill) (born 1972), American politician 
Patrick Sherrill (1941–1986), mass murderer who perpetrated the August 20, 1986, Edmond post office shooting
Robert Sherrill (1924–2014), investigative journalist
Wilma M. Sherrill (born 1939)

See also
Aqeela Sherrills, a campaigner against gang violence